Where the City Meets the Sky – Chasing Yesterday: The Remixes is a remix album by English rock band Noel Gallagher's High Flying Birds on 25 September 2015 the album compiles all the official remixes from Chasing Yesterday, including work from Erol Alkan (under the alias name Beyond Wizard's Sleeve), Andrew Weatherall, Toydrum,  Massive Attack's 3D, and David Holmes (who later produced the next album).

Track listing

Digital version

Physical version

References

2015 remix albums
Noel Gallagher's High Flying Birds albums
Remix albums by British artists